Yponomeutoidea is a superfamily of ermine moths and relatives. There are about 1,800 species of Yponomeutoids worldwide, most of them known to come from temperate regions. This superfamily is one of the earliest groups to evolve external feeding and to colonize herbs in addition to shrubs and trees.

Families
The family composition of Yponomeutoidea has varied over time, with a 2013 study assigning eleven families:
Argyresthiidae
Attevidae
Bedelliidae
Glyphipterigidae
Heliodinidae
Lyonetiidae
Plutellidae
Praydidae
Scythropiidae
Yponomeutidae
Ypsolophidae

Etymology 

The word Yponomeutoidea comes from the Ancient Greek  meaning under and  meaning food or dwelling, thus "feeding secretly, or burrow".

References

Sources
Firefly Encyclopedia of Insects and Spiders, edited by Christopher O'Toole, 2002
van Nieukirken et al., 2011. Order Lepidoptera Linnaeus, 1758. In:Zhang, Z.-Q. (ed.) Animal Biodiversity: an outline of higher-level classification and survey of taxonomic richness. Zootaxa 3148: 212-221.

External links
leptree

 
Lepidoptera superfamilies